Zlatinov is a Bulgarian surname. Notable people with the surname include:

Petar Zlatinov (born 1981), Bulgarian footballer
Vladislav Zlatinov (born 1983), Bulgarian footballer

See also
Zlatanov

Bulgarian-language surnames